Canadanthus is a North American monotypic genus of flowering plants in the family Asteraceae. The only species is Canadanthus modestus (formerly Aster modestus), commonly known as great northern aster or western bog aster. It is native to most of Canada (Alberta, British Columbia, Manitoba, New Brunswick, Ontario, Saskatchewan, Quebec, and Yukon) and to northern parts of the United States (Alaska, Idaho, Michigan, Minnesota, Montana, North Dakota, Oregon, and Washington).

Description
Canadanthus modestus is an herbaceous perennial spreading by means of underground rhizomes, thus producing large colonies. It has several flower heads, each with pink or purple ray florets and white or yellow disc florets.

Citations

References

External links

Astereae
Monotypic Asteraceae genera
Flora of North America